Bethel Bible Seminary is located at 45-47 Grampian Road Kowloon in Hong Kong. It was founded in 1925 as part of the Bethel Mission in Shanghai. It was first named Bethel Bible College, offering a three-year curriculum. It moved to Hong Kong in 1938 and was renamed Bethel Bible Seminary in 1947, changing to a four-year curriculum offering a Bachelor of Theology degree.

Principal and dean 
 1930-1973: Dr. Alice Lan
 1973-1990: Rev. Donald C. Y. Wong
 1990-2008: Rev. Gaspard K.T. Lam
 2008-2009: Rev. Yiu Kam Hung  - Acting
 July 2009 – present: Dr. Fai Luk

Grade 2 Historic Building 
Its building was listed as historic building in 1993, and on December 18, 2009, was recognized as a Grade II historic building by Leisure and Cultural Service Department - HKSAR Government.

Building redevelopment plan 
For development, Board of Director of Bethel Church decided to redevelop the seminary building.

Regarding to the Minutes of 470th Meeting of the Metro Planning Committee of Town Planning Board (HKSAR Government) on 7 September 2012, the application was approved in principle.

Course development 
 In 1989, set up Certificates in Biblical/Theological Studies for Church Leaders.
 In 1994, set up Certificates/Diploma in Christian Counseling, Clinical Pastoral Education and Pastoral Counseling Education.
 In 1997, affiliated with Acadia University and Started offering Master of Divinity, Master of Art (Theology) and Master of Theological Studies.
 In 1998, registered as a professional organization {The Association for Clinical Pastoral Education and Pastoral Counseling Education (Hong Kong) Limited.} HKACPE/PCE, hoping that this organization will help promote the training.
 In 1998, set up Bethel Pastoral Counseling Centre to promote a Bible-based counseling to integrate our faith with counseling and to serve the community at large.
 In 1999, set up a new program in Bachelor of Theological Studies for lay leader to do move in depth research and studies in Bible and in Theology.
 In 2004, set up Master of Christian Marriage & Family Therapy 
 In 2006, set up Master of Christian Counseling & Social Service
 In 2007, set up Bachelor of Christian Counseling and Christian Education
 In 2012, set up Doctorate program in Ministry, Transformational Leadership

References

External links 

Bethel Bible Seminary
Minutes of 470th Meeting of theMetro Planning Committeefrom Town Planning Board(HKSAR Government) - reviewing the redevelopment of Bethel Bible Seminary building  application
Bethel Pastoral Counselling Centre
Ray Bakke Centre for Urban Transformation

Universities and colleges in Hong Kong
Seminaries and theological colleges in Hong Kong
Transnational Association of Christian Colleges and Schools